Akseli Keskinen (born 21 July 1999) is a Finnish sailor. He competed in the Nacra 17 event at the 2020 Summer Olympics.

References

External links
 
 

1999 births
Living people
Finnish male sailors (sport)
Olympic sailors of Finland
Sailors at the 2020 Summer Olympics – Nacra 17
Place of birth missing (living people)